The year 1762 in science and technology involved some significant events.

Biology
 Charles Bonnet's Considerations sur les corps organisées is published in Amsterdam, synthesising current knowledge of cell biology and presenting his theory of palingenesis, intended to refute the theory of epigenesis.
 Courses begin at the first veterinary school, established by Claude Bourgelat in Lyon.

Mathematics
 September – Society for Equitable Assurances on Lives and Survivorships is established in London, pioneering mutual insurance using a method of actuarial science devised by mathematician James Dodson.
 Joseph-Louis Lagrange discovers the divergence theorem.

Pharmacology
 Antoine Baumé publishes his textbook Éléments de pharmacie théorique et pratique in Paris.

Physics
 Joseph Black first makes known his discoveries on latent heat, in Glasgow.

Awards
 Copley Medal: Not awarded

Births
 April 10 – Giovanni Aldini, Italian physicist (died 1834)
 November 20 – Pierre André Latreille, French zoologist (died 1833)

Deaths
 February 20 – Tobias Mayer, German astronomer (born 1723)
 March 21 – Nicolas Louis de Lacaille, French astronomer (born 1713)
 June 13 – Dorothea Erxleben, German physician (born 1715)
 July 10 – Jan Frederik Gronovius, Dutch botanist (born 1690)
 July 13 – James Bradley, English Astronomer Royal (born 1693)
 July 30 – William Braikenridge, English clergyman and geometer (born 1700)

References

 
18th century in science
1760s in science